Kevin Nathaniel House Jr. is a former professional American football player. He played professionally for the San Diego Chargers and the Seattle Seahawks.

References

Players of American football from Missouri
American football cornerbacks
San Diego Chargers players
1979 births
Living people
George D. Chamberlain High School alumni
University of South Carolina alumni
Seattle Seahawks players